Ragalparvi also spelled as Ragalparvi is a village in the Sindhanur taluk of Raichur district in the Indian state of Karnataka. Ragalaparvi is located near to Pothnal stream joining Tungabhadra river. Ragalaparvi lies on road connecting Pothnal-Ayanur.

Demographics
 India census, Ragalaparvi had a population of 2,318 with 1,133 males and 1,185 females and 441 Households.

See also
Ayanur
Pothnal
Puldinni
Olaballari
Sindhanur
Raichur

References

External links

Villages in Raichur district